The 2008 Zimbabwean parliamentary election included elections to the House of Assembly and the Senate, contested by three major parties, the ruling ZANU-PF and the two formations of the Movement for Democratic Change (MDC-T and MDC-M), as well as several smaller parties and many independents officially backed by presidential candidate Simba Makoni through the Mavambo movement.

Candidates for the House of Assembly election

Bulawayo

Harare

Manicaland

Mashonaland Central

Mashonaland East

Mashonaland West
Sabina mugabe

Masvingo

Matabeleland North

Matabeleland South

Midlands

Candidates for the Senate election

Bulawayo Metropolitan Province

Harare Metropolitan Province

Manicaland Province

Mashonaland Central Province

Mashonaland East Province

Mashonaland West Province

Masvingo Province

Matabeleland North Province

Matabeleland South Province

Midlands Province

External links
List of winning candidates from kubatana.net

2008 Zimbabwean general election
Politics of Zimbabwe
Zimbabwe politics-related lists